Ludwig Günderoth (2 November 1910 – 1 March 1994) was a German football striker and later manager.

References

1910 births
1994 deaths
German footballers
SV Waldhof Mannheim players
VfR Mannheim players
Association football forwards
German football managers
SV Waldhof Mannheim managers
20th-century German people